The North Eastern Conference is a high school athletic conference made up of ten teams in northeastern Wisconsin, centering primarily around the Green Bay, Fox Valley and Marinette County areas. Conference schools are members of the Wisconsin Interscholastic Athletic Association.

Conference history
The North Eastern Conference was founded as the Eastern Valley Conference in 2007 as a merger of four teams from the East Central Conference and six teams from the Valley 8 Conference.

2013
In 2013, the WIAA unveiled plans for a new structure of several area conferences. The plan called for the departure of Berlin, Ripon, and Winneconne of the Eastern Valley to the revived East Central Conference, with Xavier going to the Bay Conference. Denmark, Luxemburg-Casco, Marinette and Oconto Falls would leave the Bay to the North Eastern along with Olympian Conference member Wrightstown. Waupaca would move to the Bay for football only.

2015
The plans created in 2013 came into effect, and the new conference was renamed from the Eastern Valley Conference to the North Eastern Conference because the location is no longer only in the Fox Valley area. It now includes schools from the Green Bay, Fox Valley, and Marinette metropolitan areas.

Membership

Current members

References 
Wisconsin high school sports conferences
High school sports conferences and leagues in the United States